The women's 4 × 100 metres relay event at the 2020 Summer Olympics took place on 5 and 6 August 2021 at the Japan National Stadium. There were 16 competing relay teams, with each team having 5 members from which 4 were selected in each round.

Background
This was the 22nd appearance of the event, having appeared at every Olympics since women's athletics was introduced in 1928.

Qualification

A National Olympic Committee (NOC) could qualify a relay team of 5 athletes in one of three ways. A total of 16 NOCs qualified.

 The top 8 NOCs at the 2019 World Athletics Championships qualified a relay team.
 The top 8 NOCs at the 2021 World Athletics Relays qualified a relay team.
 Where an NOC placed in the top 8 at both the 2019 World Championships and the 2021 World Relays, the quota place was allocated to the world ranking list as of 29 June 2021. In this case, 2 teams did so, so there are 2 places available through the world rankings.

The qualifying period was originally from 1 May 2019 to 29 June 2020. Due to the COVID-19 pandemic, the period was suspended from 6 April 2020 to 30 November 2020, with the end date extended to 29 June 2021. The qualifying time standards could be obtained in various meets during the given period that have the approval of the IAAF. Both indoor and outdoor meets are eligible. The most recent Area Championships may be counted in the ranking, even if not during the qualifying period.

Competition format
The event continued to use the two-round format introduced in 2012.

Records
Prior to this competition, the existing world, Olympic, and area records were as follows.

The following national records were established during the competition:

Schedule
All times are Japan Standard Time (UTC+9)

The women's 4 × 100 metres relay took place over two consecutive days.

Results

Heats
Qualification Rules: First 3 in each heat (Q) and the next 2 fastest (q) advance to the Final

Heat 1

Heat 2

Final
Setting a national record, Jamaica won the gold medal with the third fastest time in history.

References

Women's 4 x 100 metres relay
Olympics 2020
Women's events at the 2020 Summer Olympics
Olympics